Vugar Nariman oglu Orujov (born 26 October 1971 in Baku, Azerbaijani SSR, Soviet Union) is a Russian two-time freestyle wrestling world champion and an Olympic bronze medalist of Azerbaijani heritage.

He competed in both the 1992 Summer Olympics, where he competed for the Unified Team, and the 1996 Summer Olympics, taking third and fourth respectively.  He is currently a head coach at Nassau Community College in East Garden City, New York.

He has three sons, one of them Vitali Arujau represents Cornell University in NCAA Division I.

References

External links
 Profile at DatabaseOlympics
 Profile at FILA Wrestling Database

1971 births
Living people
Sportspeople from Baku
Soviet male sport wrestlers
Azerbaijani emigrants to Russia
Belarusian people of Azerbaijani descent
Belarusian male sport wrestlers
Olympic wrestlers of the Unified Team
Olympic wrestlers of Russia
Wrestlers at the 1992 Summer Olympics
Wrestlers at the 1996 Summer Olympics
Russian male sport wrestlers
Olympic bronze medalists for the Unified Team
American wrestling coaches
Olympic medalists in wrestling
World Wrestling Championships medalists
Medalists at the 1992 Summer Olympics
European Wrestling Championships medalists